"Working Man" is a song by rock band Rush from their self-titled debut album. In an interview on the Rolling Stone YouTube channel, bassist and lead vocalist Geddy Lee said that "Working Man" is his favorite song to play live. "Working Man" became a favourite among Rush fans; the guitar solo appeared on Guitar World magazine's 100 Greatest Guitar Solos list.

Release and reception
Donna Halper, then a disc jockey and music director at WMMS in Cleveland, Ohio, is credited with getting Rush noticed in the United States by playing "Working Man" on the air. The song proved particularly popular in the working-class city. The response resulted in a record deal for the band, which gave her special thanks for her part in their early history and dedicated their first two albums to her.

Two versions of the song are available as downloadable tracks for the music video game series Rock Band. One is a cover based on the original recording, while the other is a previously unreleased master track with an alternate guitar solo. The alternate version proved so popular that the band released it on the iTunes Store, under the title "Working Man (Vault Edition)".

Performances
Like all of the songs on the band's first album, the song features original drummer John Rutsey, who was replaced by Neil Peart in 1974. On the 1976 live album All the World's a Stage, the song segues into "Finding My Way" and a drum solo by Peart. After not being performed live for most of the 1980s and 1990s, it returned to Rush's setlists during the 2002 Vapor Trails Tour. With the exception of the 2007-08 Snakes & Arrows Tour, the song appeared on every live setlist through the R40 Live Tour of 2015, the band's last. It was included on the live albums and videos of the tours in which it was used, except for Clockwork Angels Tour; for R40 Live, it was played as part of a medley with "What You're Doing" and ended with a snippet of "Garden Road," a song from the band's early catalog.

Cultural references
The song is featured in episodes of the television series My Name is Earl, That '70s Show, Supernatural, and American Dad!, the 2011 film Goon, and a 2014 Walmart television advertisement.

Major League Baseball player Pete Alonso of the New York Mets uses the song as his walk up song.

Personnel
Geddy Lee – bass, lead vocals
Alex Lifeson – guitar
John Rutsey – drums

Notable covers
 Danielle Armstrong covered "Working Man" for the opening credits of Transporter: The Series. This version was arranged by Jamie Forsyth.
 Thirteenth season American Idol contestant Caleb Johnson performed this song during the Top 12 round, and was met with moderate reviews from the judges.
 New Orleans R&B icon Cyril Neville covered "Working Man" on his 2013 album Magic Honey.

See also
List of songs recorded by Rush

References

External links

 RUSH LYRICS - Working Man

Rush (band) songs
1974 songs
Songs about labor
Songs written by Geddy Lee
Songs written by Alex Lifeson